John Kenrick may refer to:

 John Kenrick (c. 1740–1794), a.k.a. John Kendrick (American sea captain)
 John Kenrick (MP) (1735–1799), British politician for Bletchingley
 John Kenrick (historian) (1788–1877), British, re classical period
 John Kenrick (theatre writer) (born 1959), American, also film historian